The 2004–05 North West Counties Football League season was the 23rd in the history of the North West Counties Football League, a football competition in England. Teams were divided into two divisions: Division One and Division Two.

Division One 

Division One featured four new teams promoted from Division Two

 Colne, 
 Formby
 Great Harwood Town
 Maine Road

League table

Division Two 

Division Two featured three new teams:

 Cammell Laird, promoted as a runners-up of the West Cheshire League
 New Mills, joined from the Manchester Football League
 Silsden, promoted as champions of the West Riding County Amateur League

League table

References

 https://web.archive.org/web/20120414021104/http://www.nwcfl.com/archives/previous-league-tables/2004-05.htm

External links 
 NWCFL Official Site

North West Counties Football League seasons
9